François-Édouard Picot (10 October 1786 in Paris – 15 March 1868 in Paris) was a French painter during the July Monarchy, painting mythological, religious and historical subjects.

Life
Born in Paris, Picot won the Prix de Rome painting scholarship in 1813, and gained success at the 1819 Salon with his neoclassical L'Amour et Psyché (Louvre).
 
He painted The Crowning of the Virgin in the church of Notre-Dame-de-Lorette

and had large commissions for the Galerie des Batailles. He exhibited at the Paris Salon between 1819 and 1839. 
Elected to the Paris Academy in 1836, Picot was also created an officer of the Legion of Honor in 1832.

He studied with François-André Vincent and Jacques-Louis David.

Works

 L'Amour et Psyché (Cupid and Psyche, 1817)
 Portrait of Adélaïde-Sophie Cléret (c.1817)
 Portrait of Nicholas-Pierre Tiolier (c. 1817)
 The Annunciation
 The Death of Sapphira (1819) Church of Saint Séverin.
 Two ceilings in the Louvre (Musée des Antiques)
 Couronnement de la Vierge (The Crowning of the Virgin (Notre-Dame de Loretto)
 L'Etude et le Génie dévoilent l'antique Egypte à la Grèce (Study and Genius reveals ancient Egypt and Greece, 1827)
 Cybèle protège contre le Vésuve les villes de Stabiae, Herculanum, Pompéi et Résina (Cybele protects from Vesuvius the towns of Stabiae, Herculanum, Pompeii and Resina, 1832)
 Léda (1832)
 The Siege of Calais, (1838)
 Peste de Florence (Grenoble Museum)

Pupils

His pupils include:
 Étienne-Prosper Berne-Bellecour
 Édouard Théophile Blanchard
 Louis Émile Benassit
 Jean-Achille Benouville
 François-Léon Benouville
 William-Adolphe Bouguereau
 Alexandre Cabanel
 Charles-Alexandre Coëssin de la Fosse
 Jean-Jacques Henner
 Louis Héctor Leroux
 Émile Lévy
 Gustave Moreau
 Léon Bazile Perrault
 Jules-Émile Saintin 
 Jehan Georges Vibert

References

External links

Francois-Edouard Picot at the Art Renewal Center

1786 births
1868 deaths
19th-century French painters
French male painters
Artists from Paris
French neoclassical painters
Prix de Rome for painting
Officiers of the Légion d'honneur
Pupils of Jacques-Louis David
Burials at Père Lachaise Cemetery
18th-century French male artists